The Slinger is a 1960 Czech WWII drama film directed by Karel Kachyňa based on a story by Jan Mareš.

Plot
In 1944 Czech boy František, liberated from a concentration camp, is sent to a Czechoslovak unit located near Dukla Pass. Lieutenant Zlonický assigns him as an unsalaried employee to work in a laundry unit at the front.

Cast
 Michal Koblic as Private pupil František Bureš
 Marie Magdolenová as Marijka Kalinčuková
 Vladimír Menšík as Military Cook Josef Pekárek
 Vladimír Hlavatý as Corporal Antonín Krupka
 Gustáv Valach as Private First Class Dalibor Šamonil
 Oldřich Musil as Private Evald Heller
 Martin Ťapák as Private Imrich Gallo
 Stanislav Remunda as Lieutenant Zlonický
 Miloslav Holub as Major Kubeš

References

External links

1960 films
Czech war drama films
Czechoslovak drama films
Czechoslovak war films
1960s Czech-language films
Czech World War II films
Czechoslovak World War II films
Eastern Front of World War II films
Czechoslovak black-and-white films
1960s Czech films
Czech resistance to Nazi occupation in film